Brice Dieudonne Eyaga Bidias (born 26 November 1998) is a Cameroonian basketball player who plays for FAP and the Cameroon national basketball team.

Club career
After playing at the junior levels, Eyaga Bidias joined Condor of the Ligue de Basketball du Centre (LBC) in 2018.

In the fall of 2019, Eyaga Bidias played with the Gabonese club Manga BB in the 2021 BAL qualification games. In the following year, he joined FAP and was on the roster for the inaugural season of the Basketball Africa League but did not appear in any game. 

In the following season, the 2022 season, Eyaga had a break-out season as he helped FAP reach the BAL semi-finals by averaging 11 points and a team-high 6.5 rebounds per game. On 27 May, he was named to the BAL All-Defensive Team.

National team career
Eyaga Bidias played with the Cameroon national basketball team. He was on the preliminary squad for AfroBasket 2021, but was cut before the start of the tournament. He later played in the qualifiers for the 2023 World Cup.

Career statistics

BAL

|-
|style="text-align:left;"|2022
|style="text-align:left;"|FAP
| 8 || 8 || 28.2 || .408 || .222 || .571 || 6.5 || 1.5 || 1.0 || 1.0 || 11.0
|-

References

External links
RealGM profile

Living people
1998 births
Cameroonian men's basketball players
Power forwards (basketball)
Condor BC players
FAP Basketball players
Sportspeople from Yaoundé